The thirtieth season of the animated television series The Simpsons premiered on Fox in the United States on September 30, 2018, and ended on May 12, 2019. Al Jean returns as showrunner, a position he has held since the thirteenth season. Matt Selman also contributed as showrunner for the episodes "Heartbreak Hotel", "Krusty the Clown", "The Clown Stays in the Picture" and "Bart vs. Itchy & Scratchy". The series hit a milestone 650th episode on January 6, 2019 with the episode "Mad About the Toy", and the season also saw both the renewal of the series for two additional seasons on February 6, and the acquisition of the majority of 21st Century Fox's assets (which includes the show itself) by Disney on March 20.

30th Anniversary 
The series celebrated its thirtieth anniversary with a 15-hour marathon on the channel FXX starting December 9, 2018. Airing 30 handpicked episodes by showrunner Al Jean. Additionally, Simpsons Roasting on an Open Fire, the show's first episode, re-aired on Fox on December 23, 2018.

Episodes

Production

Casting 
This season also features the first episode written by voice actor Nancy Cartwright with the episode "Girl's in the Band", making her the third of the six main cast members to have an episode to their name (Dan Castellaneta having cowritten many scripts since season 11 and Harry Shearer writing the season 28 episode "Trust But Clarify"). This also makes her the first female main cast member credited with a writing credit, and the season overall hit a new high for women writers with ten females with episodes credited to them, including two scripts from Megan Amram and a joint script by veteran Simpsons writer Jeff Martin and his daughter Jenna Martin. For the eSports-themed episode "E My Sports" the show's producers hired League of Legends developers Riot Games as consultants in order to get the eSports referenced in the show as authentic as possible.

The season features guest appearances from Dave Attel, Emily Deschanel, Gal Gadot, Jonathan Groff, Pete Holmes, Rhys Darby, Tracy Morgan, RuPaul, Bryan Batt, Lawrence O'Donnell, Patti LuPone, Marc Maron, Guillermo del Toro, Wallace Shawn, Awkwafina, Chelsea Peretti, Nicole Byer, Ken Jeong, John Lithgow, Liev Schreiber, Illeana Douglas and Jenny Slate. The episode "Heartbreak Hotel" saw George Segal reprising the role of Nick from Who's Afraid of Virginia Woolf? that he had originally played 52 years earlier, musician Josh Groban provides the singing voice for longtime character Professor Frink, musician Dave Matthews gives voice to Lloyd the bartender from The Shining and the five main cast members of Bob's Burgers also reprised their roles for a crossover couch gag in the episode "My Way or the Highway to Heaven". Several prior guest stars returned this season, including longtime recurring guest star Jon Lovitz in various roles, two stints from actor J. K. Simmons to make his 4th and 5th appearances in the series, Scott Thompson returning for his fourth time as Grady, comedian Jackie Mason reprising his role as Rabbi Krustofsky once more, and Terry Gross and Ken Burns appearing as themselves. Natasha Lyonne, Will Forte and Werner Herzog all returned to roles they had previously performed once before playing Sophie Krustofsky, King Toot and Walter Hotenhoffer respectively.

Reception

Ratings

Controversy
The show came under fire for the episode "D'oh Canada" in late April 2019. While the episode mocked American and Canadian heads of government Donald Trump and Justin Trudeau and brought up the SNC-Lavalin affair, the aspects that caused offense were largely related to a Frank Sinatra parody song where Homer made fun of Upstate New York and for the use of the slur "newfie" in relation to Canadian residents of Newfoundland. In the latter several Canadian children chime "stupid newfies" before a character closely resembling Ralph Wiggum calls himself one and proceeds to beat a baby seal pup plush toy with a club while singing about being a Newfoundlander. Musician Bruce Moss rejected an offer from the show's producers to use his song "The Islander" for the episode, referring to them as "morally bankrupt" and turning down $20,000 US.

Accolades 
In February 2019, writer Stephanie Gillis won the Writers Guild of America Award for Outstanding Writing in Animation at the 71st Writers Guild of America Awards for penning the season premiere episode "Bart's Not Dead". On July 16, 2019 it was announced that the show had received two nominations for the 71st Primetime Creative Arts Emmy Awards, with the episode "Mad About the Toy" being nominated for the Primetime Emmy Award for Outstanding Animated Program and cast member Hank Azaria getting a nomination for the Primetime Emmy Award for Outstanding Character Voice-Over Performance for the episode "From Russia Without Love" playing the characters Moe Szyslak, Carl Carlson, Duffman and Kirk Van Houten. The winners were announced on September 14, 2019 at the Creative Arts Emmy Awards ceremony, where "Mad About the Toy" won the show its 11th award in the category, while Hank Azaria lost to Seth MacFarlane for his performances in the animated series Family Guy.

References

Simpsons season 30
2018 American television seasons
2019 American television seasons